Stockerau is a town in the district of Korneuburg in Lower Austria, Austria. Stockerau has 15,921 inhabitants, which makes it the largest town in the Weinviertel. Stockerau is also called "Lenaustadt" (Lenau Town) because the Austrian poet Nikolaus Lenau often spent time with his grandparents here.

Population

Amenities
Leisure facilities are various: wellness centre, sports centre with three gyms, judo and table tennis gym, skittle alley and football stadium. In addition there are indoor and outdoor tennis facilities.

Stockerau offers a range of exhibitions, concerts, readings and singing evenings in the cultural centre "Belvedereschlößl". In the cellar of this castle, built in 16th century and revitalised by the town community in the year 1984, you will find the district museum.

Between Stockerau and the Danube there is a large forest called the "Au".

Saint Coloman was martyred here in 1012, and is known as St. Coloman of Stockerau.

Mayors
List of all mayors of Stockerau according to the official homepage of the town:
 1893–1908 Julius Schaumann
 1908–1912 Josef Weineck
 1912–1914 Wenzel Kreuz
 1919–1927 Eduard Rösch
 1927–1933 Josef Wolfik
 1933–1938 Johann Schidla
 1938–1945 Heinrich Mayrl
 1945–1970 Josef Wondrak (SPÖ) (1893–1982)
 1970–1979 Franz Blabolil
 1979–2006 Leopold Richentzky
 2006–2019 Helmut Laab
 since 2019 Andrea Völkl

Transportation
Given its relatively close distance to Vienna, S3 of the Vienna S-Bahn operates half-hourly service to Vienna as well as hourly service to Hollabrunn. Regional trains operate from Vienna to Retz and Znojmo in the north and Wiener Neustadt and Payerbach-Reichenau in the south.

Notable people
 Ernst Herbeck (1920–1991), German poet
 Wolfgang Katzian (born 1956), trade unionist
 Karl Ritter (born 1959), musician and composer
 Thomas Lang (born 1967), musician
 Josef Pröll (born 1968), politician
 Johannes Grenzfurthner (born 1975), artist and filmmaker
 Daniela Kix (born 1984), tennis player
 Manuela Zinsberger (born 1995), footballer

References

External links
Official website

Cities and towns in Korneuburg District